The Yorkshire Patent Steam Wagon Co. was a steam wagon manufacturer in Leeds, England. They produced their first wagon in 1901. Their designs had a novel double-ended transverse boiler. In 1911 the company's name was changed to Yorkshire Commercial Motor Co., but reverted to Yorkshire Patent Steam Wagon Co. in 1922. Steam wagon production ceased in 1937, and the company was finally dissolved in 1993.

Other local steam vehicle manufacturers were John Fowler & Co., J&H McLaren & Co., and the Mann's Patent Steam Cart and Wagon Company, along with several steam railway engine builders.

Double-ended boiler

The novel double-ended transverse-mounted boiler was used to avoid problems of tilting when climbing hills. Internally it resembled a locomotive or Fairlie boiler with a central firebox and multiple fire-tubes to each end. In the Yorkshire though, a second bank of fire-tubes above returned to a central smokebox and a single chimney.

Preserved machines

There are 10 known preserved machines recorded. Several of these were restored by the late Tom Varley.

There is one of these engines in Australia, in regular use at Milawa, near Melbourne, Victoria. It is fitted with a lightweight open-air body. It is numbered 1443.

There is also one at Booleroo Steam & Traction Preservation Society Inc
 Yorkshire Steam Waggon - Wagon No 34 of 1903 by the Yorkshire Patent Steam Wagon Company of Leeds England. It is the oldest known surviving Yorkshire in the world.
Imported by T Russel of Geelong Vic and used by Smith & Timms in Adelaide SA before going to Whyalla SA for use in the construction of the town's first dam. It finished its working life in 1918.

See also 
 L&YR railmotors, Kerr Stuart steam railmotors with a similar boiler design
 South African Dutton road-rail tractors, rail tractors converted from Yorkshire wagons.

References

External links

 The Yorkshire wagon page about the Yorkshire Patent Steam Wagon Co
 Yorkshire Steam Wagon, Virtual Steam Car Museum

Steam wagon manufacturers
Steam road vehicle manufacturers
Manufacturing companies based in Leeds
Defunct companies based in Leeds
1901 establishments in England
British companies established in 1901
Vehicle manufacturing companies established in 1901
British companies disestablished in 1993
1993 disestablishments in England